Pachypanchax arnoulti is a species of aplocheilid killifish endemic to Madagascar.  Its natural habitat is rivers and lakes. It is threatened by habitat loss and invasive species. The specific name of this fish honours the French ichthyologist and herpetologist Jacques Arnoult (1914-1995) in recognition of his contributions to the knowledge of Madagascar's fish fauna. It was described by Paul V. Loiselle in 2006 with the type locality given as "Swamp draining into tributary stream of Ikopa River, flowing parallel to RN-4 at Antanimbray village, 17°10'79"S, 46°50'97"E, Betsiboka River drainage, Madagascar, elevation 246 meters".

References

arnouti
Freshwater fish of Madagascar
Taxonomy articles created by Polbot
Fish described in 2006
Taxa named by Paul V. Loiselle